Yani Aleksandrov (born 16 January 1997) also known as Yani Xander is a Bulgarian actor. Yani was born in Burgas, Bulgaria. At the age of 19 Yani decided to move to London, United Kingdom to pursue career in acting and 'follow his dream'. He had his training at the world-renowned Anthony Meindl's Actors Workshop (AMAW) in London.
Yani Xander is best known for his role as Headless Humphrey’s Body in the BBC TV Series Ghosts.

Filmography

Film

Television

Reality TV

External links

1997 births
Living people
Bulgarian television actors